Michael Kaplan may refer to:
 
 Michael Kaplan (biologist) (born 1952), American biology researcher, medical professor and clinical physician
 Michael Kaplan (costume designer), American movie costume designer
 Myq Kaplan (born 1978), American stand-up comedian